ChatZilla is an IRC client that is part of SeaMonkey. It was previously an extension for Mozilla-based browsers such as Firefox, introduced in 2000. It is cross-platform open source software which has been noted for its consistent appearance across platforms, CSS appearance customization and scripting.

Early history
On April 20, 1999, it was reported that Mozilla, at the time the open-source arm of AOL's Netscape Communications division, had announced the commencement of "an instant messaging and chat project with the stated goal of supporting a wide variety of chat protocols, including "the venerable Internet Relay Chat". Other companies were also developing chat systems. We recognize that there's a lot of interest in the instant messaging space,' said AOL spokesperson Catherine Corre, referring to the Mozilla project. 'This is a recognition of the interest in that area.  At the time, the new chat client proposal was reported as being "competition" to AOL's own AOL Instant Messenger chat client, and on April 21, 1999, the announcement was rescinded "pending further review by Netscape." Independently, programmer Robert Ginda developed an IRC client and submitted it to the Mozilla project, which as of September 1999 planned to introduce it with the planned release of Mozilla browser.
Named "ChatZilla", the client was available in development form in May 2000 for the Netscape 6.01 browser, and Mozilla 0.8.

Features
ChatZilla runs on any platform on which SeaMonkey can run, including OS X, Linux, and Microsoft Windows, and provides a "consistent user interface across the board." It can also be used as a standalone app using XULRunner.

It contains most general features of IRC clients, including connecting to multiple servers at once, maintaining a built-in list of standard networks, searching and sorting of available channels, chat logging, Direct Client-to-Client ("DCC") chat and file transfers, and user customization of the interface.
ChatZilla includes automatic completion of nicknames with the Tab key, and appends a comma if the nickname is the first word on a line. It also provides completion of /commands with the Tab key, and a "quick double-Tab" presents a list of available commands based on what's been typed so far.
The text entry window can be "single line", in which the Enter key sends the composed text, or "multiline" in which allows composing larger text sections with line breaks, and the Ctrl-Enter key combo sends the text block.
JavaScript is used for running scripts and messages are styled with CSS, which
can be controlled by the user: by selecting from the View menu, dragging a link to a .css file to the message window, or with the /motif command.  DCC is supported which allows users to transfer files and chat directly between one another.  The sender of each message is shown to the left of the text as a link—clicking the link opens a private chat window to that user.

ChatZilla is included with SeaMonkey and was available for download to other Mozilla-based browsers such as Firefox as an extension. It could also be run in a tab in Firefox.

Plugins
ChatZilla offers many plugins, which extend the functionality in the user-experience of the add-on.

Some of these plugins include:
 TinyURL – replaces long URLs (typically those with more than 80 characters) with TinyURL links
 googleapi – searches Google and displays the top result
 cZiRATE – shares the song the user is currently listening to on iRATE Radio

WebExtension
The introduction of Firefox Quantum (version 57) has dropped the support of add-ons, and so has stopped ChatZilla from working inside Firefox. Work has begun to move the code to a WebExtension.

Reception
Reviews of ChatZilla have varied from enthusiastic, in the case of users familiar with IRC, to  unimpressed, for reviewers more accustomed to other chat client user interfaces.  A 2003 review in Computers for Doctors of Mozilla 1.0, referred to IRC client applications as "not very user-friendly, and the same goes for ChatZilla. You won't find any pop-up icons, or happy little noises telling you somebody wants to chat."
In 2004, Jennifer Golbeck, writing in IRC Hacks, pointed out its cross-platform consistency, and found it "quick and easy to start using", and has "great support for changing the appearance of chat windows with motifs...(CSS files)."

In a 2008 overview of extensions for Firefox in Linux Journal, Dan Sawyer described ChatZilla as an "oldie-but-goodie", "venerable", "with all the trimmings", "handsomely organizes chat channels, logs, has an extensive built-in list of available channels, supports DCC chats and file transfers, and has its own plugin and theming architecture." The application "implements all the standards very well, and for those who prefer to keep desktop clutter to a minimum but still enjoy fighting with random strangers on IRC, ChatZilla is a must-have."

Forks

Ambassador
Ambassador is a fork of ChatZilla compatible with Pale Moon, Basilisk, and Interlink Mail & News.

See also

Comparison of Internet Relay Chat clients
List of free and recommended Mozilla WebExtensions
List of Internet Relay Chat commands

References

External links

ChatZilla homepage
Running ChatZilla on XULRunner
Chatzilla networks.txt generator

Mozilla Application Suite
Free Internet Relay Chat clients
Unix Internet Relay Chat clients
Internet Relay Chat clients
Windows Internet software
Classic Mac OS software
Instant messaging clients for Linux
Unix Internet software
Cross-platform software
2000 software
Software using the Mozilla license
Software that uses XUL
Free Firefox legacy extensions